Mun Hae-yeong (born 24 July 1980) is a South Korean rower. She competed in the women's lightweight double sculls event at the 2000 Summer Olympics.

References

1980 births
Living people
South Korean female rowers
Olympic rowers of South Korea
Rowers at the 2000 Summer Olympics
Place of birth missing (living people)